Narongsak Khongkaew, is a Thai futsal Defender, and currently a member of  Thailand national futsal team.

References

Narongsak Khongkaew
1979 births
Living people